Phoenician is a Unicode block containing characters used across the Mediterranean world from the 12th century BCE to the 3rd century CE. The Phoenician alphabet was added to the Unicode Standard in July 2006 with the release of version 5.0. An alternative proposal to handle it as a font variation of Hebrew was turned down. (See PDF summary.)

The Unicode block for Phoenician is U+10900–U+1091F. It is intended for the representation of text in Paleo-Hebrew, Archaic Phoenician, Phoenician, Early Aramaic, Late Phoenician cursive, Phoenician papyri, Siloam Hebrew, Hebrew seals, Ammonite, Moabite and Punic.

The letters are encoded U+10900  aleph through to U+10915  taw, U+10916 , U+10917 , U+10918  and U+10919  encode the numerals 1, 10, 20, and 100, respectively, and U+1091F  is the word separator.

Characters

History
The following Unicode-related documents record the purpose and process of defining specific characters in the Phoenician block:

References

Unicode blocks
Phoenician alphabet